The women's team épée was one of ten fencing events on the fencing at the 1996 Summer Olympics programme. It was the first appearance of the event. The competition was held on 24 July 1996. 33 fencers from 11 nations competed.

Brackets

Rosters

Cuba - 6th place
 Milagros Palma
 Mirayda García
 Tamara Esteri

Estonia - 5th place
 Heidi Rohi
 Maarika Võsu
 Oksana Yermakova

France 
 Laura Flessel-Colovic
 Sophie Moressée-Pichot
 Valérie Barlois-Mevel-Leroux

Germany - 7th place
 Claudia Bokel
 Eva-Maria Ittner
 Katja Nass

Hungary - 4th place
 Adrienn Hormay
 Gyöngyi Szalay-Horváth
 Tímea Nagy

Italy 
 Elisa Uga
 Laura Chiesa
 Margherita Zalaffi

Japan - 11th place
 Nanae Tanaka
 Noriko Kubo
 Yuko Arai

Russia 
 Karina Aznavuryan
 Mariya Mazina
 Yuliya Garayeva

South Korea - 10th place
 Kim Hui-Jeong
 Go Jeong-Jeon
 Lee Geum-Nam

Switzerland - 9th place
 Gianna Hablützel-Bürki
 Michèle Wolf
 Sandra Kenel

United States - 8th place
 Elaine Cheris
 Leslie Marx
 Nhi Lan Le

References

Epee team
1996 in women's fencing
Fen